The National Institute of Economic and Social Research (NIESR), established in 1938, is Britain's oldest independent economic research institute. The institute is a London-based independent UK registered charity that carries out academic research of relevance to business and policy makers, both nationally and internationally.

The institute receives no core funding from government or other sources. The bulk of funding comes from research projects awarded or commissioned by a variety of sources, including government, all acknowledged in full in their published materials. The terms of their grants prohibit any involvement from funding bodies in determining or influencing content. Funders include government departments and agencies, the research councils (particularly the Economic and Social Research Council (ESRC)), charitable foundations, the European Commission, and the private sector. The institute is a partner with the ESRC's Centre for Macroeconomics), and also with the Economic Statistics Centre of Excellence, which is funded by the Office for National Statistics.

History
The NIESR was established in 1938 with funding from the Rockefeller Foundation, the Pilgrim Trust, the Leverhulme Trust and the Halley Stewart Trust. The vision of its founders was to carry out research to improve understanding of the economic and social forces that affect people's lives, and the ways in which policy can bring about change.

Directors, presidents and council members
Professor Noel Hall was the first director of the institute, before its official existence in 1938, from 1937 until 1940. Geoffrey Crowther then became "acting" director from 1940 but was called upon for war service in June of that year. From June 1940 to 1949, Sir Henry Clay carried out the duties of director and chair of council.

Directors post 1952 

 Bryan Hopkin, 1952–1957
 Christopher Saunders, 1957–1965
 David Worswick, 1965–1982
 Andrew Britton, 1982–1995
 Martin Weale, 1995–2011
 Jonathan Portes, 2011–2015
 Dame Frances Cairncross, (acting director) 2015–2016
 Professor Jagjit S Chadha, 2016–present

Chairs of council 
There have been chairs of council since the institute was created. The first was Lord Stamp, from 1937 to 1942. He was succeeded by Sir Henry Clay, who held the position from 1942 until 1949. Subsequent chairs included Humphrey Mynors, Sir Austin Robinson, Sir John Woods, Sir Robert Hall, Sir Hugh Week, Sir Donald MacDougall, and Sir Kenneth Berrill. Diane Coyle became the first woman to hold the position in the history of the institute, taking over the position from Sir Tim Besley. Since November 2018, Professor Nicholas Crafts CBE has held the position.

Presidents 

Lord Burns was president from 2003 to 2010, followed by Sir Nicholas Monck from 2011 to 2013, and subsequently Sir Charles Bean. The current president is Sir Paul Tucker.

Organisation
Research areas covered by the National Institute include Destitution, Exclusion, and Strategies for Well-Being; Education and Skills; Labour, Employment and Wages; Macro-Economic Modelling and Forecasting; Macro-Economics of Climate Change; Monetary Theory and Policy; Political Economy; and Productivity, Trade, and Regional Economies.

National Institute Economic Review 
Since 1959, the NIESR has published the National Institute Economic Review. Principal topics covered by the Review include economic modelling and analysis, education and training, productivity and competitiveness, and workings of the international economy. Each edition Includes detailed forecasts of both UK and World Economies, a commentary, and special articles by Institute researchers and external authors. Since 2021, the UK and Global Economic Outlook have been published in-house.

Trackers on the UK Economy 
Each month NIESR tracks a series of key economic indicators, including Consumer Price Inflation (CPI), Gross Domestic Product (GDP) and Wages, and uses this data to forecast the future of the UK economy.  In addition, each quarter they publish a Term Premium Tracker and have, since February 2021 been tracking UK Covid-19 infection rates.

NiGEM
An important output of NIESR has been a macroeconomic model called NiGEM (National Institute's Global Econometric Model) which is used to produce quarterly forecasts for the UK and global economy (published in the National Institute Economic Review). Forecasts are also published for various other OECD countries. The model is used by the UK Treasury, IMF, Bank of England, the OECD and European Central Bank. In 2014, a Société Générale researcher used the model to analyse the effect of falling oil prices on the world economy.

References

External links 
National Institute of Economic and Social Research official site

Economic research institutes
1938 establishments in the United Kingdom
Organisations based in the City of Westminster
Political and economic think tanks based in the United Kingdom
Research institutes established in 1938
Research institutes in London